In statistics and signal processing, the method of empirical orthogonal function (EOF) analysis is a decomposition of a signal or data set in terms of orthogonal basis functions which are determined from the data.  The term is also interchangeable with the geographically weighted Principal components analysis in geophysics.

The i th basis function is chosen to be orthogonal to the basis functions from the first through i − 1, and to minimize the residual variance. That is, the basis functions are chosen to be different from each other, and to account for as much variance as possible. 

The method of EOF analysis is similar in spirit to harmonic analysis, but harmonic analysis typically uses predetermined orthogonal functions, for example, sine and cosine functions at fixed frequencies. In some cases the two methods may yield essentially the same results.

The basis functions are typically found by computing the eigenvectors of the covariance matrix of the data set. A more advanced technique is to form a kernel out of the data, using a fixed kernel. The basis functions from the eigenvectors of the kernel matrix are thus non-linear in the location of the data (see Mercer's theorem and the kernel trick for more information).

See also
 Blind signal separation
 Multilinear PCA
 Multilinear subspace learning
 Nonlinear dimensionality reduction
 Orthogonal matrix
 Signal separation
 Singular spectrum analysis
 Transform coding
 Varimax rotation

References and notes

Further reading
 Bjornsson Halldor and Silvia A. Venegas "A manual for EOF and SVD analyses of climate data", McGill University, CCGCR Report No. 97-1, Montréal, Québec, 52pp., 1997.
 David B. Stephenson and Rasmus E. Benestad. "Environmental statistics for climate researchers". (See: "Empirical Orthogonal Function analysis")
 Christopher K. Wikle and Noel Cressie. "A dimension reduced approach to space-time Kalman filtering", Biometrika 86:815-829, 1999.
 Donald W. Denbo and John S. Allen. "Rotary Empirical Orthogonal Function Analysis of Currents near the Oregon Coast", "J. Phys. Oceanogr.", 14, 35-46, 1984.
 David M. Kaplan  "Notes on EOF Analysis"

Spatial analysis
Statistical signal processing